Andries van der Merwe (born 31 March 1994) is a South African sprinter.

He won a gold medal in the 110 metre hurdles at the 2011 World Youth Championships in Athletics, in a winning time of 13.41 seconds.

He attended Afrikaanse Hoër Seunskool in Pretoria.

References

External links

1994 births
Living people
Sportspeople from Pretoria
South African male sprinters
South African male hurdlers
20th-century South African people
21st-century South African people